Agesistrata (died 241 BC), was a Spartan queen, married to king Eudamidas II of Sparta. 

She was the daughter of king Eudamidas I of Arachidamia.  She and her mother were the wealthiest women in Sparta.  She and her mother were initially unwilling to support her son's radical reforms, but was convinced to do so by her brother Agesilaus, and donated their fortunes to finance the reforms.  When her son, Agis IV was deposed in 241, both she and her mother were killed. 

Issue

 Agis IV
 Archidamus V

References

Further reading
 

3rd-century BC Greek women
Ancient Spartan queens consort
3rd-century BC Spartans
241 BC deaths
Murdered royalty
Spartan princesses